"Love Gun" is a song by the American rock band Kiss, first released on their 1977 album of the same name. The B-side is the album track "Hooligan", a song written by drummer Peter Criss.

Paul Stanley, who sings lead vocals on the song, has claimed in several interviews since its release that it is one of his favorite Kiss songs, offering the opinion that "'Love Gun' is quintessential Kiss, and is probably one of the five signature essential Kiss songs." Stanley has also said that "The Hunter" section of the Led Zeppelin song "How Many More Times" inspired the lyrics of "Love Gun". Stanley plays bass on the track in addition to singing and playing rhythm guitar. Billboard described it as having a "high energy level" with "power guitar riffs." Cash Box said that it "has cute lyrics, and the army of Kiss admirers should jack it up to respectable chart status."  Record World said that it features "hard-edged rock 'n' roll."

"Love Gun" has been played on every Kiss tour since its release, and has made numerous appearances on Kiss live albums and compilation albums, despite the fact that it peaked at only no. 61 on the Billboard Hot 100.

Charts

References

1977 singles
1977 songs
Kiss (band) songs
Casablanca Records singles
Songs written by Paul Stanley